The Victim of Prejudice is a novel by the English novelist Mary Hays. Published in 1799, it is Hays' second novel.

The novel, depicting the challenges that its protagonist, Mary, encounters throughout her life, underlines the difficulty that women experienced in gaining sufficient means of living and their dependency on men in late 18th century England. As such, the novel was part of a larger grouping of feminist writing that occurred around this time of British history, including the works of Mary Wollstonecraft, Jane Austen, Elizabeth Inchbald and Mary Robinson.

Plot summary
The main character, Mary, is brought up by her guardian Mr. Raymond in a loving environment, separate from the prejudiced and patriarchal society of Britain. This unsullied childhood begins to shift, when at the age of 11, two brothers, William and Edmund Pelham, come to live with and be educated by Mr. Raymond. Mary soon develops a close friendship with William, and on two separate occasions their games make Mary run into Sir Peter Osborne, who lies in the neighboring house. On the first occasion, William convinces Mary to steal grapes from the neighbor's garden, but is caught by several young men, one of which being Sir Peter Osborne. Sir Peter Osborne threatens to kiss Mary but she is able to escape before he is able to. On the second occasion, Mary attempts to save a hare from a hunting party during her games with William, and Sir Peter Osborne whips her several times with his horse whip before forcefully kissing her. 

As William and Mary grow older, Mr. Raymond sees that he must separate them in order to maintain his promise to the boys' father; that he should keep them from any acquaintance that might negatively affect their future as men of fashion and wealth. He sends Mary to live with a friend, Mr. Neville, and his family. During this time, Mary is saved from being swept away to sea by a boat of seamen, one of which is Sir Peter Osborne. After returning her to the Nevilles, Sir Peter Osborne makes several offers to pay a visit to Mary and shows up at the house on several occasions, all of which are denied by the Nevilles. 

The rest of the novel details the trials that Mary encounters upon the death of her benevolent guardian Mr. Raymond, and her subsequent reliance on the charity of those around her.

References

1799 novels
18th-century novels